The Mannan people are a scheduled tribe (ST) of Kerala, India. They are one of the Adivasi
who live in Idukki District. The Mannan follow a matrilineal system of descent, and their ruler, the Raja Mannan, is elected by community headmen from among those eligible by heredity. They are traditional forest-dwellers, gaining their livelihood by collecting and utilising resources of the dense forest, and supplementing these with shifting agriculture. They are believed to be descendants of a Pandyan King and their mother tongue is Tamil. Changes since the mid-20th century, including an influx of settlers from the plains of Kerala, degradation of the forest environment, and exposure to modern economic and cultural systems have all posed challenges to their survival as a people continuing their customary way of life.

Demographics

Environment and economic development

See also
 Kozhimala the Mannan settlement that is the community's "headquarters"
 The Scheduled Tribes and Other Traditional Forest Dwellers (Recognition of Forest Rights) Act, 2006

References

Further reading

External links
 Government of Kerala: Iddukki District official website

Ethnic groups in India
Social groups of Kerala